Bowen Hills railway station is located on the North Coast line in Queensland, Australia. It serves the Brisbane suburb of Bowen Hills. North of the station, the Ferny Grove line branches off.  The station is one of four inner city stations that form a core corridor through the centre of Brisbane.

History
There have been three railways stations named Bowen Hills. The first from 1882 to 1889 was near Campbell Street. In 1890, a new station opened at the south end of the Abbotsford Road tunnel. In 1971, to allow for the Mayne marshalling yards to be expanded, Bowen Hill and Mayne Junction stations were closed with a new Bowen Hills station opening in 1973.

As part of the quadruplication of the line from Roma Street station, Platforms 3 and 4 opened on 11 June 1996.

Accidents
In October 1904, Archibald Kerr, a 16-year-old boy, fell from a moving train near Bowen Hills station; the boy died from the injury to the back of his head caused by the fall. At the time, the train driver was not aware of the event until he was told about it by the signalman on the train's return journey at Brunswick Street station. The train gate was blamed as the cause of the accident at first, but after the gate was found to be in working order, the cause of the accident wasn't known.

Services
Bowen Hills station is served by Airport, Beenleigh, Caboolture, Doomben, Ferny Grove, Redcliffe Peninsula, Shorncliffe, Springfield and Sunshine Coast line services. Also see Inner City timetable It is adjacent to the Mayne Stabling Yards, with many services terminating here.

Services by platform

References

External links

Bowen Hills station Queensland Rail
Bowen Hills station Queensland's Railways on the Internet

Bowen Hills, Queensland
Railway stations in Brisbane
Railway stations in Australia opened in 1973
North Coast railway line, Queensland